Permanent residence may refer to:

 Permanent Residence, a 2009 Hong Kong film

It may also refer to:
 Permanent residency
 Australian permanent resident
 Permanent residency in Canada
 New Zealand permanent residency
 Permanent residency in Singapore
 Permanent residence (United States)